S5/8 was a serial communications standard devised in the United Kingdom in the  1980s as a simplified subset of RS-232 intended to make interoperability easier. Although published by the British Standards Institution as standard DD 153:1990, it was not widely adopted, and the BSI standard was later withdrawn.

Description
S5/8 differed from RS-232 in using 0 and +5 V signalling levels, simplified handshaking, and a fixed data transfer rate of 9600 bits per second. An 8-pin DIN 45326 connector was specified as standard, although a physically compatible 180-degree 5-pin DIN connector could be used to carry a subset of the signals. Data transmission consisted of frames containing one start bit, 8 data bits and one stop bit, with no parity bit.

Two classes of device were specified, D and S. D-devices could supply power (5 V up to 20 mA) at the connector, whereas S-devices could derive power from a connected D-device.

Pin assignment

Applications 
The S5/8 standard was adopted by a few British microcomputers, such as the Thorn EMI Liberator and the CST Thor XVI.

References 
 

Serial buses